Series 27 of Top Gear, a British motoring magazine and factual television programme, was broadcast in the United Kingdom on BBC Two during 2019, consisting of five episodes between 16 June and 14 July. Following the previous series, production staff discontinued Extra Gear, while both Matt LeBlanc and Rory Reid left the programme, leaving Chris Harris to be joined by two new co-hosts: Paddy McGuinness and Freddie Flintoff. The new line-up proved popular with viewers, effectively improving the programme's viewing figures after the previous two series. This series' highlights included a road trip across Ethiopia, converting a hearse into a family car, and the presenters creating their own budget electric sports cars.

Production 
On 31 May 2018, Matt LeBlanc announced that he would leave Top Gear after the completion of the twenty-sixth series.

On 22 October 2018, it was confirmed that Freddie Flintoff and Paddy McGuinness would join a returning Chris Harris in the forthcoming series, replacing both LeBlanc and Rory Reid, while Sabine Schmitz continued her recurring presenting role.

During an interview on BBC Radio 1 in January 2019, Harris revealed that filming for this series had commenced.

Episodes

References

External links 
 

2019 British television seasons
Top Gear seasons